The word Watoro (singular Mtoro, from Swahili language verb kutoroka "to escape") references escaped slaves from West Africa during the 19th century. The established in Tanzania, Kenya and Somalia.

Sources 
 The Structure of Slavery in Indian Ocean Africa and Asia,  (S. 61)
 Jan-Georg Deutsch: Emancipation Without Abolition in German East Africa, 2006,  (S. 75)

Slavery in Africa